Mu kratha is a Southeast Asian cooking method, originating in Thailand.  In Philippines, Singapore and Malaysia, it is known as mookata. In Laos, it is knows as Sindad.

History
Mu kratha means 'pan pork' in Thai (mu is 'pig' or 'pork' and kratha is 'pan' or 'skillet'). Mu kratha resembles a Korean barbecue and a Chinese hot pot.  The Thai version uses charcoal. The dining concept spread throughout Thailand and into Laos, the Philippines, Malaysia, Indonesia and Singapore.

Preparation and serving

Sliced meat (most often pork) is grilled on the dome in the centre while the vegetables and other ingredients, such as fish balls, cook in the soup (also called Thai suki). The hot pot sits on a pail of burning charcoal which grills or boils the food. The best foods for this cooking method are pork, chicken, mutton, lamb, seafood, vegetables, and mushrooms. The local traditional Thai mu kratha is usually served with nam chim suki, a popular dipping sauce.  It is well known for using chili sauce as the main ingredient. Some restaurants serve nam chim seafood to accompany seafood.
 
When cooking mu kratha, a chunk of fat is commonly grilled at the apex of the pan so its grease prevents food from sticking.

In popular culture
Thailand has many mu kratha restaurants as it is easy to prepare and suits a variety of foods.

See also

Barbecue
Barbecue grill
Regional variations of barbecue
List of Thai dishes
Thai cuisine

References

Thai cuisine
Table-cooked dishes
Pork dishes
Barbecue
National dishes